Hříškov is a municipality and village in Louny District in the Ústí nad Labem Region of the Czech Republic. It has about 400 inhabitants.

Administrative parts
Villages of Bedřichovice and Hvížďalka are administrative parts of Hříškov.

References

Villages in Louny District